Alexander Cecil Knox Mackenzie (7 August 1870 – 11 April 1947) was an Australian cricketer. He played 48 first-class matches for New South Wales and Rest of Australia between seasons 1888/89 and 1906/07.  In the Sydney grade competition he is most well known for having played for the Paddington and Waverley clubs.

Early life

Alick Mackenzie was the eldest child of Nicholas James and Mary Ann (née Robinson) Mackenzie, and was born on 7 August 1870 at his parents residence located at 9 Queen Street in The Rocks,  Sydney.  Nicholas was a prominent shopkeeper who ran a mercery business in George Street.  He was a leading member of the Orange Order and held various positions in the organisation such as Grand Treasurer.

Alick first attended Crown Street Public School and was later part of the first enrolment of students to Sydney Boys High School in 1883.  He represented his high school in cricket and rifle shooting.

Growing up in Paddington, Alick and his younger brothers were childhood friends of Victor Trumper, Alick's future Paddington and New South Wales teammate.

Junior club cricket
Alick's first season of competitive club cricket was the 1885/86 season in which he played for the Winchester club.  Despite it being his first season of cricket, he won the award for the highest batting average in the team. The following season, 1886/87 he played for the Mansfield club.  In his last season of junior cricket, 1887/88, he played for the Verona cricket club, during which he made a top score of 206 not out.

Senior club cricket

Alick Mackenzie joined the newly formed Sydney Cricket Club for the 1888/89 season.  The club was founded by Phil Sheridan, a prominent Sydney cricket identity of the time.  Future Australian test captains Monty Noble and Syd Gregory were teammates of Alick's in the Sydney team. He would play with the club for five seasons before the introduction of the electorate club system in 1893.  During his time with the Sydney Cricket Club he was one of the most successful batsmen across all of the Sydney clubs and it was his performances for the club which saw him selected to make his first class debut for New South Wales in late 1888 in a game against an Australian XI.  His season-by-season record for the club is as follows:

Sydney Grade Cricket

Paddington 1893/94 to 1899/1900

When the Sydney Grade Cricket competition was formed in 1893 he played for the Paddington club due to the fact he resided in that suburb.  During his time at Paddington he was a teammate of Australian Test stars Victor Trumper and Monty Noble.  Two of Alick's younger brothers also played alongside him for Paddington in this period.  Alick won two premierships with Paddington in seasons 1894/95 and 1897/98.

Waverley 1900/01 to 1909/10

After the 1899/1900 season Alick moved to the Waverley club as he was now living within their residential boundaries.  He would play for the Waverely club until his retirement at the conclusion of the 1909/10 season. Alick captained Waverley to a premiership in season 1902/03.  This was the clubs first premiership.  That same season Alick was the leading aggregate run-scorer and obtained the highest batting average in the competition.  Throughout the rest of his career Alick was a consistent run-scorer for Waverley consistently averaging over 40 runs per innings.

Alick retired from all competitive cricket at the conclusion of the 1909/10 season.  In total he scored 6,275 runs in his first grade career at an average 42.39 over 155 innings with 15 centuries and 32 fifties and a highest score of 214.

First-class cricket

Alick made his first-class debut as an 18 year old in December 1888 when he was selected to play for New South Wales against an Australian XI.  He performed well on debut, his score of 34 being amongst the best of the NSW batsman and made against Australia's best bowlers of the day.  Alick would play for NSW on a regular basis from that point until season 1902/03.  He played only one more game for NSW after that season, which came in season 1906/07 when he appeared for NSW against Western Australia in Perth.

During the 1893/94 season Alick was selected in the New South Wales side that toured New Zealand from January to February 1894.  He was the leading run scorer on the tour.

The highlight of Alick's first class career came during the 1897/98 season when he scored his only first class century (130) playing for New South Wales in a match against the touring England side.  In two matches against the England team that season Alick made consecutive scores of 80, 59, 130, 52 for an average of 80.25.  As a result of these performances, he was generally considered to be in contention for a spot in the Australia side for the fifth test match of the 1897/98 Ashes series but ultimately didn't gain selection.

Alick retired at the conclusion of the 1909/10 season.  As a reward for his services to the game he was named as manager of the Australian side that toured New Zealand from February to April 1910 and subsequently appeared for the Australian side in their match against Taranaki.

First-class career statistics

H.V. Hordern and the Googly 

Alick Mackenzie was a contemporary of H. V. Hordern who is well known as the first Australian cricketer to develop the ability to bowl the googly (wrong 'un) delivery.  The googly is a delivery bowled by a leg spin bowler in a normal manner, but which turns in the opposite direction to a normal leg-break.  The delivery was originally developed by English cricketer Bernard Bosanquet in the early 1900s while he was a student at Oxford University and he used it to great effect against Australia's batsman on England's tour of Australia in 1903/04.  After witnessing Bosanquet bowl the googly, Hordern committed to teaching himself how to bowl it.  Prior to the commencement of the 1905/06 season Hordern asked Alick to join him at the Sydney Cricket Ground so that he could practice bowling the new delivery.  The first two deliveries that he bowled were full tosses and promptly hit to the boundary by Mackenzie.  The third landed on the pitch, spun, beat the bat and clean bowled the batsman.  It was after this occurrence that Hordern begun using the googly in first-class matches.

Personal life 
On 19 May 1900 Alick married Jessie Maud Phelps. They had four children.

After leaving school, Alick entered employment as a clerk with the New South Wales Department of Audit.  He would remain with the department until his retirement in the 1930s.

Life after cricket 
After his cricket career finished in 1910, Alick took up the sport of competitive lawn bowls.

References

External links
 

1870 births
1947 deaths
Australian cricketers
New South Wales cricketers
Cricketers from Sydney